Deel is an unincorporated community in Buchanan County, Virginia, United States.

History
A post office was established at Deel in 1908, and remained in operation until it was discontinued in 1957. Raul Deel served as postmaster.

References

Unincorporated communities in Buchanan County, Virginia
Unincorporated communities in Virginia